Catocala contemnenda is a moth of the family Erebidae first described by Staudinger in 1891. It is found in Xinjiang, China.

References

Moths described in 1891
contemnenda
Moths of Asia